Tuesday's Child is a British television production company founded in 2012 by Karen Smith. The company is best known for TV shows such as The Hit List and LEGO Masters.

History 
In 2012, Tuesday's Child was founded by television executive Karen Smith, the current managing director. With offices in London and Glasgow, the company specialises in entertainment and popular factual formats. Prior to establishing the company, Smith began her career at This Morning, going on to produce programmes such as Comic Relief Does Fame Academy and The Games. She then co-devised and was the launch Executive Producer of Strictly Come Dancing. Beyond the success of Strictly, she became the Creative Director of BBC Entertainment. Prior to establishing Tuesday's Child, Smith was Joint Managing Director of Shine TV.

The company's first commission was RV Rampage for Travel Channel in 2013 and their first programme to air was Superstar Dogs for Channel 4 in 2014.

The company's name is based on the popular children's rhyme Monday's Child. Referring to the rhyme, Smith says: “I was born on a Tuesday and so were my twins. Tuesday’s Child is full of grace which I think is a great virtue, although as a teenager I would have preferred to have been Monday’s Child!”

Programming

Current 
 The Hit List – Saturday night BBC One music quiz show hosted by Marvin and Rochelle Humes is currently in its third series.
 Extraordinary Escapes – four-part staycation series with Sandi Toksvig for Channel 4. The series sees Sandi explore remote holiday homes in the UK with close friend Prue Leith, actor Alison Steadman, comedian Sindhu Vee and comic actor Jessica Hynes. The programme will air on Wednesday 10 February.
 Guessable? – Comedy panel show for Comedy Central UK. Hosted by Sara Pascoe with assistant John Kearns and team captains Alan Davies and Darren Harriott featuring celebrity guests. Series 1 was broadcast in October 2020 and Series 2 production will start soon, date to be announced.
 LEGO Masters US – Following the success of Season 1, Season 2 for FOX is now in production. The hunt for the best amateur LEGO builders, led by host Will Arnett, is jointly produced by Endemol Shine North America, Tuesday's Child, and Plan B Entertainment.
 Queens for the Night – reality television competition that sees a group of celebrities become drag queens.

Former 

 Ghost Bus Tours – ITV2 horror reality travelogue through Lithuania and culminating in a night in a haunted prison. Featuring Lady Leshurr, Jordan Davies and Darren Harriott, the one-off show broadcast on October 29 as part of ITV2's Halloween programming.
 Killer Camp – an ITV2 horror reality game show set in an 80s style American summer camp with a secret killer among the contestants. The successful series was also broadcast on the CW Network in the US.
 A LEGO Journey To The East – a documentary that followed the Danish toy company's design team as they created a toy range specifically for Chinese children.
 Full House – BBC Wales fixed-rig format that eavesdropped on the lives of the players and staff at Judges Bingo Hall, one of the most popular social hubs in South Wales.
 Head Hunters – BBC One daytime game show with Rob Beckett that puts a price on contestants’ general knowledge. The series was repeated in December 2020 and January 2021 on BBC Two.
 High Society: The Cannabis Cafe – two-part fixed rig documentary for Channel 4 that saw pairs of Brits trying cannabis for the first time in a Dutch coffee shop.
 Epic Celebrity Fails – Channel 5 clip show with voice over from Chris Ramsey.
 LEGO Masters – Channel 4 competition format to find the UK's and Ireland's best amateur LEGO builders, hosted by Melvin Odoom. Series 1 aired in 2017 and Series 2 in 2018.
 How To Build A Robot – a Channel 4 film about the work of eccentric robot inventor, David McGoran, narrated by David Tennant.
 Turkey A to B – a six part travelogue for the Travel channel following father and son, Larry and George Lamb, as they explore the Silk Road treasures of Turkey.
 Pitch Battle – BBC One singing show in which rival singing groups battled against each other for a £50,000 prize. The show was hosted by Mel Giedroyc with Kelis and Gareth Malone as its judges and each episode featured a guest judge, including Nick and Joe Jonas, Chaka Khan, Will Young, Bebe Rexha and Seal.
 Man vs Robot – AI-based game show hosted by Dermot O’Leary. Man vs Robot was a 2018 pilot produced for FOX US.
 Sean Conway: On The Edge – a three-part series for Discovery following extreme adventurer, Sean Conway, as he takes on a self-supported, 4000+ mile, continuous Ultra Triathlon circumnavigating the entire coast of mainland Britain.
 Flavour of the US – Travel Channel and Food Network branded content for Brand USA showcasing different culinary cities with local celebrated chefs.
 For What It's Worth – a BBC One antiques-themed quiz show that ran for two series and was hosted by Fern Britton, it aired in 2016.
 Britain's Biggest Superyachts: Chasing Perfection – an hour long behind-the-scenes programme about Sunseeker, Britain's biggest superyacht builder, as they build their first flagship superyacht. Broadcast on BBC Two in 2016.
 My Crazy Christmas Lights -–a Channel 4 one-hour documentary following the eccentric homeowners behind some of Britain's biggest and best Christmas light displays.
 You're Back in the Room – ITV hypnosis game show hosted by Phillip Schofield and starring hypnotist Keith Barry. It ran for two series and aired in 2015 and 2016.
 Sean Conway: Running Britain – extreme adventurer Sean Conway ran from John O’Groats to Land's End, covering nearly 1000 miles in just six weeks, in this two-part programme for Discovery. He set a new record in British ultra-sports, becoming the first person ever to have swum, cycled and run the length of Britain.
 Food and Wine Adventures Romania – a culinary travel docu-series for Travel Channel and Food Network with Jenny Powell and wine connoisseur, Olivier Magny.
 RV Rampage – Set in New Zealand, five couples drive RVs on a 1000-mile road trip from Auckland down to South Island, competing in tasks along the way. Produced for Travel Channel and hosted by Henry Cole and Amanda Byram.
 Superstar Dogs: Countdown to Crufts – entertainment programme hosted by John Barrowman for Channel 4, broadcast in 2014 in the lead up to The Kennel Club’s annual show. A celebrity special was produced for RTÉ in Ireland with Moya Doherty’s Tyrone Productions.

Awards and nominations

International success 
Tuesday's Child formats have had success internationally, with formats such as LEGO Masters and The Hit List being reproduced in other countries.

 LEGO Masters – the LEGO competition show has so far been commissioned in the US (FOX), Australia (Channel Nine), France (M6), The Netherlands and Belgium (RTL), Germany (RTL), Poland (TVN) and Sweden (tv4).
 The Hit List – the music quiz show has been produced in Finland for MTV3 and as De Hit Kwis on AVROTROS in The Netherlands.
 For What It's Worth – the antiques-themed quiz show was produced in Germany for ZDF in 2016.
 You're Back in the Room – the hypnosis game show was made in multiple territories, including The Netherlands, France, Australia (Channel Nine), Slovakia, Slovenia, Poland, Colombia, Canada, New Zealand and Portugal. In 2019, It was produced by Tuesday's Child and BBC LA Productions in the US under the name Hypnotize Me and hosted by Taye Diggs featuring hypnotist Keith Barry for The CW Network.

References

External links
 

Mass media companies established in 2012
Television production companies of the United Kingdom
Film production companies of the United Kingdom
2012 establishments in the United Kingdom